Harrison Sweeny (born 9 July 1998) is an Australian racing cyclist, who currently rides for UCI WorldTeam .

Major results

2015
 9th Road race, Oceania Junior Road Championships
2016
 Oceania Junior Road Championships
1st  Time trial
5th Road race
 1st  Time trial, National Junior Road Championships
 3rd Overall Driedaagse van Axel
 4th Overall Tour des Portes du Pays d'Othe
 10th Road race, UCI Junior Road World Championships
2017
 1st Stage 1a (TTT) Toscana-Terra di Ciclismo
2018
 10th Overall Tour de Langkawi
2019
 1st Stage 4 Rhône-Alpes Isère Tour
2020
 1st Piccolo Giro di Lombardia
2023
 10th Trofeo Serra de Tramuntana

Grand Tour general classification results timeline

References

External links

1998 births
Living people
Australian male cyclists
People from Warwick, Queensland
Cyclists from Queensland